Great Moments at Di Presa's Pizza House is the name of a 2005 album by alternative comedian Neil Hamburger, which is presented as an audio documentary.  It was released by Drag City on April 19, 2005.

Track listing

"Welcome to Di Presa's Pizza House" (1:20)
"Rememerable Memories" (1:41)
"May 31, 1962" (2:25)
"Flour Power" (2:37)
"Throwing Away Neil's Paycheck" (2:45)
"Big Heart" (2:17)
"Di Presa's Tries Some Different Things" (3:39)
"Bad Reviews" (2:27)
"Bad Pizza" (2:35)
"Summer of 2004" (2:25)
"Tragedy" (1:30)
"More Tragedies" (2:31)
"Selling Di Presa's" (2;15)

References

Gregg Turkington albums
Drag City (record label) albums
2005 albums